Baseball Heaven (BBH) is a 27-acre baseball complex in Yaphank, New York on Long Island,. The complex is located close to Long Island MacArthur Airport. Baseball Heaven has been around since August 6, 2002. Baseball Heaven attracts talent from the New England and Mid-Atlantic states. The complex features four ninety foot base path artificial turf fields and three are seventy foot artificial turf fields. Approximately 750,000 people visit Baseball Heaven on an annual basis.

Ownership
Baseball Heaven was acquired by Steel Sports on June 27, 2011. BBH completed the build of a 12,000-square-foot facility, $1.9 million indoor training facility on its site called Steel Sports Academy.

Features
BBH's amenities include below grade dugouts, connecting bullpens, warning tracks, P.A. systems, electronic scoreboards, and an artificial turf. The complex accommodates its spectators with ballpark seating, concessions, restaurant, and a picnic area.

Notable events
The Baseball Heaven complex has been host to the National Youth Baseball Championships (NYBC) since 2014. In September 2014, a Long Island Little League coach was struck in the head  by a baseball during warmups and was knocked unconscious. He was rushed to the nearby Brookhaven Memorial Hospital Medical Center in East Patchogue where he was pronounced dead.

References 

Baseball venues in New York (state)
College baseball venues in the United States
Sports venues in Suffolk County, New York
2004 establishments in New York (state)
Sports venues completed in 2004